(1152–1185) was the son of Taira no Kiyomori, and one of the Taira Clan's chief commanders in the Genpei War at the end of the Heian period of Japanese history.

He was victorious at the Battle of Uji in 1180. He also became successful in the Battle of Yahagigawa in 1181. 

Tomomori was again victorious in the naval Battle of Mizushima two years later. 

At the Battle of Dan-no-ura, when the Taira were decisively beaten by their rivals, Tomomori joined many of his fellow clan members in committing suicide. He tied an anchor to his feet and leapt into the sea.

Tomomori has become a popular subject for kabuki plays.

Gallery

References 

1152 births
1185 deaths
Taira clan
Kabuki characters
People of Heian-period Japan
People of the Genpei War
Japanese military personnel who committed suicide
Suicides by drowning in Japan